Salt River Hydroelectric Powerplant, on the Salt River and on the border of Idaho and Wyoming, near Etna, Wyoming, was built in 1938.

It was listed on the National Register of Historic Places (NRHP) in 1993.

It is significant for its role in development of the Star Valley area of Wyoming.  It was funded by the New Deal's Rural Electrification Administration program, which began in 1935.  The powerplant operated from 1938 to 1967, serving a wide area;  it was made redundant by cheap power from the Bonneville Dam project.  The powerplant was in rare good condition for a facility of its era, including all of its power generation machinery, as of the NRHP listing.

References 

Industrial buildings and structures on the National Register of Historic Places in Idaho
Industrial buildings and structures on the National Register of Historic Places in Wyoming
Industrial buildings completed in 1938
Buildings and structures in Lincoln County, Wyoming
Buildings and structures in Bonneville County, Idaho
Hydroelectric power plants in Wyoming
Historic districts on the National Register of Historic Places in Idaho
National Register of Historic Places in Bonneville County, Idaho
National Register of Historic Places in Lincoln County, Wyoming
Energy infrastructure on the National Register of Historic Places
1938 establishments in Idaho
1938 establishments in Wyoming